V.I.P. is the fifth studio album by hip hop group Jungle Brothers, released in 2000.

"Freakin' You" peaked at #70 on the UK singles chart.

Production
The album was written in Jamaica, and produced by Alex Gifford of Propellerheads.

Critical reception
AllMusic called the album "fun, funky, and infectious -- a party record where everyone sounds like they're having a blast." Entertainment Weekly wrote that "excessively eclectic production ... smothers the hip-hop duo’s jazzily organic rhymes." The Riverfront Times called it "a great ... melding of progressive electronic grooves and rhymes, a contender for Album of the Year."

Salon wrote: "Most disturbing, the pallor of the dead lingers all over V.I.P. Not dead like Tupac and Biggie but, rather, the end of an era and a style, and of the individuals who were first responsible for those innovations."

Track listing 
All tracks produced by Alex Gifford.
"V.I.P."
"I Remember"
"Get Down"
"Early Morning"
"Down with the Jbeez" (featuring Black Eyed Peas)
"The Brothers"
"Party Goin' On"
"Sexy Body"
"Playing for Keeps"
"Jbeez Rock the Dancehall"
"Freakin' You"
"Strictly Dedicated"
"Jungle Brother (Urban Takeover Mix)"

References

Jungle Brothers albums
2000 albums
Gee Street Records albums